The Agathyrsi were a people belonging to the Scythian cultures. The Agathyrsi were a people of mixed Iranian Scythic and Geto-Thracian origin whose bulk were Thracian while their aristocracy was closely related to the Scythians.

Name 
The name  is the Hellenized form of a Scythian name whose original form is not attested.

Location 
At the time when the Greek historian Herodotus described them, in the 5th century BC, the Agathyrsi occupied the region around the source of the Maris river, in the mountainous part of ancient Dacia now known as Transylvania in what in the present-day is the state of Romania, as well as in the regions corresponding to modern Moldavia and possibly Oltenia.

History 
The Agathyrsi were the oldest Scythian-related Iranian population to have dominated the Pontic Steppe. This origin was reflected in the genealogical myth of the Scythian peoples, according to which Agathyrsus was the eldest of the three ancestors of the Scythian peoples born of the union of the god Targitaos and the Anguipede Goddess. Because both the 1st century AD Roman geographer Pomponius Mela and the 4th century AD Roman historian Ammianus Marcellinus, basing themselves on earlier ancient Greek sources, located the Agathyrsi near the Lake Maeotis, it is therefore likely that the original homeland of the Agathyrsi was in the region of the Sea of Azov. In the 8th to 7th centuries BC, the migration of the Scythians proper from the east into the Pontic Steppe pushed the Agathyrsi westwards, away from the steppes, following which the relations between the Agathyrsi and the Scythians remained hostile.

After being expelled westwards from the steppe, the Agathyrsi settled in the territories of present-day Moldavia, Transylvania, and possibly Oltenia, where they mingled with the indigenous population who were largely Thracians. In the 5th century BC, Herodotus mentioned the presence of the Agathyrsi in the area of present-day Moldavia, to the north of the Danube and the east of the Carpathian Mountains, by which time they had become acculturated to the local Getic populations and they practised the same customs as the Thracians, although the names of their kings, such as Agathyrsus and Spargapeithes, were Iranian.

When the Achaemenid king Darius I attacked the Scythians in 513 BC, the Scythian king Idanthyrsus summoned the kings of the peoples surrounding his kingdom to a meeting to decide how to deal with the Persian invasion. The kings of the Budini, Gelonians and Sarmatians accepted to help the Scythians against the Persian attack, while the kings of the Agathyrsi, Androphagi, Melanchlaeni, Neuri, and Tauri refused to support the Scythians. When the armies of the Scythians fled to the territories of their neighbours in front of the advancing Persian army, the Agathyrsi refused to provide refuge to the Scythians, which forced them to retreat back into their own territory.

Later at some point in the 5th century BC and according to Herodotus, the Agathyrsian king Spargapeithes treacherously killed the Scythian king Ariapeithes.

The Agathyrsi were barely ever mentioned again by ancient writers after Herodotus and were last mentioned as a still existing people by Aristotle in the 4th century BC, after which they disappeared from history due to having later become completely assimilated by the Geto-Thracian populations; thus, the fortified settlements of the Agathyrsi became the centres of the Getic groups who would later transform into the Dacian culture, and an important part of the later Dacian people was descended from the Agathyrsi.

A section of the Agathyrsi might also have migrated more southwards into Thrace proper, where a group of the Agathyrsi was located on the Haemus Mons by Stephanus of Byzantium, who also suggests that a section of the Agathyrsi were present on the Rhodope Mountains by his mention of the Greeks calling the Trausi tribe who lived there as Agathyrsi.

Culture
The acculturation of the Agathyrsi into the Geto-Dacian culture of the area they settled in is evidenced by how they practised the same customs as the Thracians, although the names of their kings, such as Agathyrsus and Spargapeithes, were Iranian. Thracian customs of the Agathyrsi included their nobles practice of tattooing themselves and dyeing their hair dark blue to distinguish themselves from the common people, as well as their memorisation of their laws in song form.

Other aspects of the culture of the Agathyrsi recorded by Herodotus include the fact that they were used to living in luxury and wore golden jewellery, and their custom of having wives in common so that all the Agathyrsi would be each other's brothers and members of a single family living together without jealousy or hatred.

Archaeology 
To the archaeological presence of the Agathyrsi belongs a cemetery from the 8th to 7th centuries BC at Stoicani, as well as the Stincesti-Cotnari type fortified settlements which first appear in the 6th century BC.

Legacy
An old theory of 19th century writers (Latham, V. St. Martin, Rambaud, Newman) which, according to the 1911 Encyclopædia Britannica, is based on 'less convincing proof', suggested an identification of the Agathyrsi with the later Hunnic Akatziri tribe first mentioned by Priscus. According to E.A. Thompson, the conjecture that connects the Agathyrsi with Akatziri should be rejected outright.

See also
 Cimmerians
 Dacians
 Getae
 Scythians

Notes

References

 
 Thomson, James Oliver (1948) History of Ancient Geography, publisher: Biblo-Moser, 
 Herodotus, Rawlinson George,  Rawlinson Henry Creswicke, Wilkinson, Sir John Gardner, The History of Herodotus a new English version, Volume 3, London
 
 
 Maclagan, Robert Craig (2003) Scottish Myths publisher, Kessinger Publishing, 
 
 Parvan Vasile (1928) Dacia, Cambridge University Press

Scythian tribes
Dacian tribes
Ancient tribes in Dacia
Tribes described primarily by Herodotus